Warren Sabir McGlone (born September 17, 1969), known by the stage name Steady B, is an American hip hop emcee who, along with Schoolly D, the Fresh Prince, and Three Times Dope, was one of the first wave of Philadelphia-area emcees to gain notoriety in the mid-to-late 1980s. Steady B was a member (and de facto leader) of Philadelphia's Hilltop Hustlers crew. His musical career was relatively short-lived, and he is currently serving a life sentence in a Pennsylvania state prison for his role in the murder of Philadelphia Police officer Lauretha Vaird during a botched bank robbery in 1996.

Early life 
McGlone, affectionately known as "Boobie", was raised in the Overbrook section of West Philadelphia. More specifically in the Hilltop area, which runs roughly between the corridors of 59th Street and Lansdowne Avenue and 63rd Street and Lancaster Avenue. McGlone was introduced to hip hop while attending the former Hanna Elementary School and started practicing his freestyle skills. He would later attend and matriculate at the former Shoemaker Jr. High School. Whilst attending Overbrook High School, McGlone began testing his rap skills in battles with, among others, future Hollywood icon Will Smith, who was then known as the Fresh Prince. It was during this time that he changed his name to Steady B (Boobie).

Career

Early career 
Steady B's original DJ was Grand Dragon K.D., later replaced by DJ Tat Money, who later became the DJ for Kwamé and a New Beginning. At his best, Steady B mixed well-written metaphors and wordplay with sparse yet catchy drum tracks. He released five albums over the course of his career, with mixed success.

Steady B and Grand Dragon K.D. released a few early hip hop 12" singles on the Pop Art label in 1985. These included "Take Your Radio" (an answer record to LL Cool J's "I Can't Live Without My Radio"), "Fly Shanté" featuring Roxanne Shanté, and "Just Call Us Def". Neither of these early 12" singles feature on albums.

Steady B and Grand Dragon K.D. appeared at "UK Fresh 86" at Wembley Arena in London on July 19, 1986, known as the Hip Hop Woodstock. Recordings of his set only featured one track, "Do the Fila", his answer to Joeski Love's "Pee-Wee's Dance".

C.E.B. 
In 1991, Steady B formed the hardcore hip hop group C.E.B. with fellow local Philadelphia emcees Cool C and Ultimate Eaze, in an effort to update his style and record sales. C.E.B.'s name was a backronym for "Countin' Endless Bank", but it was also an acronym for the names of the group's three members. The trio released its only album, Countin' Endless Bank, on Ruffhouse Records in 1992. The single "Get the Point" reached No. 5 on Billboards Hot Rap Singles. The album was poorly received.

Armed robbery and murder 

On January 2, 1996, Steady B, along with C.E.B. bandmate Cool C and another local Philadelphia rapper, Mark Canty, attempted a bank robbery at a PNC bank branch in Feltonville, Philadelphia. During the botched heist, in which Steady B served as the getaway driver in a stolen minivan, Philadelphia Police Officer Lauretha Vaird, who responded to the bank's silent alarm, was shot and killed by Cool C. Vaird, an African American woman and the single mother of two children, was the first female Philadelphia police officer slain in the line of duty. The incident inspired the song "Slipped Away (The Ballad of Lauretha Vaird)", which appeared on Philadelphia trio G. Love and Special Sauce's album Yeah, It's That Easy.

Steady B was arrested at his apartment shortly after the bank robbery. Two handguns left at the scene by Cool C and Canty, including the murder weapon, were traced back to Steady, and he eventually confessed to his role in the crimes to police during interrogation.

At his trial, the State presented evidence, including testimony from Steady's wife, that Steady B, Cool C, and Canty met at Steady B's apartment shortly after the robbery, where they watched media coverage of the event on television and discussed their escape. Incriminating statements by Canty were also admitted into evidence at Steady B's trial.

On October 30, 1996, Steady B was convicted of the second-degree murder of Officer Vaird. On December 13, 1996, he was sentenced to life imprisonment without the possibility of parole.

Discography

Solo albums

Group album

References

External links 
[ AllMusic.com Biography – Steady B]

1969 births
1996 murders in the United States
African-American male rappers
American bank robbers
American people convicted of murdering police officers
American prisoners sentenced to life imprisonment
Jive Records artists
Living people
People convicted of murder by Pennsylvania
Prisoners sentenced to life imprisonment by Pennsylvania
Rappers from Philadelphia
Criminals from Philadelphia
21st-century American rappers
21st-century American male musicians
20th-century American male musicians
20th-century African-American musicians
21st-century African-American musicians